Kayne Kalache is a Lebanon international rugby league footballer who plays as a  or  for the Newtown Jets in the NSW Cup. On the 1st November 2022, Kayne signed a 3 year year deal with superleague side Wakefield Trinity.

Career
Kalache made his international debut for Lebanon in their 56–14 loss to Fiji in the 2019 Pacific Test.

References

External links
Canterbury-Bankstown profile

1998 births
Living people
Australian rugby league players
Australian people of Lebanese descent
Lebanon national rugby league team players
Rugby league players from Sydney
Rugby league props